Macroglossum bifasciata is a moth of the  family Sphingidae. It is known from India.

The abdominal lateral patches are deep chrome yellow. The underside of both wings is ferruginous tawny and the hindwing upperside has a band of deep chrome.

References

Macroglossum
Moths described in 1875